Lion of Babylon is a stone sculpture, over 2600 years old, that was found in the ancient city of Babylon, Iraq. It was discovered in 1876 by a German archaeological mission. 

The statue may have been commissioned by the Chaldean Babylonian king Nebuchadnezzar II (605–562 BC), but most experts now belief it is of Hittite origin, made during a Hittite occupation of the city.

Description 
The statue is made out of black basalt; it depicts a Mesopotamian lion standing above a lying human. The statue is two meters in length and the platform upon which it stands is one meter high. The lion weighs about 7000 kg. The statue's height is 1 meter.

On the back of the lion is a carved depression, in which it is believed that a saddle was originally placed, on which a figure of Ishtar, the goddess of fertility, love, and war, may have sat or stood.

Modern history 
The statue had been damaged over the years due to lack of protection, getting climbed on by tourists that left marks on the statue, or natural causes like erosion which Archaeologists had  already feared was going to happen without the right protection of the statue.
However, the most significant damage, as seen today, to the face and jaw was caused in 1917, as witnessed by Private Robert John Morgan of the Army Service Corps during World War I.

In 2013 the World Monuments Fund worked with the Iraq State Board of Antiquities to make improvements to the site. The Lion was cleaned and partially restored, the base of the statue was replaced, and a security barrier was added.

Symbolism 
The Lion of Babylon is a historic theme in the region. The statue is considered among the most important symbols of Babylon in particular and Mesopotamian art in general. The statue is considered a national symbol of Iraq, it has been used by several Iraqi institutions such as the Iraqi Football Association.

The lion was meant to put fear into their enemies, by showing a lion trampling a man to scare their enemies.

See also 
 Ishtar Gate
 Lion Hunt of Ashurbanipal
 Lion of Basrah
 Lion of Babylon
 Lion of Judah

References 

Archaeological discoveries in Iraq
Babylonian art and architecture
Hittite art
National symbols of Iraq
Nebuchadnezzar II
Sculptures of lions
Sculpture of the Ancient Near East